Luda za tobom (Crazy About You) is the thirteenth studio album by Yugoslav pop-folk singer Lepa Brena. It was released in December 1996 through the record label Zabava miliona.

This album was sold in a circulation of 220,000 copies.

Track listing

Personnel

Instruments

Goran Ratković – guitar
Josip Boček – guitar (10)
Nebojša Aleksić – guitar (4)
Saša Vasić – acoustic guitar (3)
Srki Boy – keyboards, accordion
Ferus Mustafov – saxophone, clarinet, bagpipes (1, 3)
Jane Jonuzović – bongos (1, 7)
Boki Milošević – clarinet (6)
Enes Mavrić – accordion (4)

Production and recording
Goran Ratković – mixing
Srki Boy – mixing

Crew
Dejan Milićević – photography

References

1996 albums
Lepa Brena albums
Grand Production albums